Lepore or LePore may refer to:

Lepore is an Italian surname (stressed on the first syllable in Italian), a regional variant of the surname Lepre, meaning hare, originally a nickname for a fleet-footed or timid person.

Agustina Lepore (born 1988), Argentine tennis player
Amanda Lepore (born 1967), American model, socialite, singer and performance artist
Cal Lepore (1919–2002), American football referee
Curtis Lepore (born 1983), American actor, musician and internet celebrity
Davide Lepore (born 1968), Italian voice actor and dubbing director
Ernest Lepore (born 1950), American philosopher and cognitive scientist
Francesco Lepore (born 1976), Italian latinist, journalist and LGBTQ activist.
Franco Lepore (born 1985), Italian footballer 
Jill Lepore (born 1966), American historian
Kirsten Lepore, American animator
Lyn Lepore (born 1961), Australian paralympic tandem cyclist
Michele Lepore-Hagan (born 1955), Representative of the 58th district of the Ohio House of Representatives
Nanette Lepore (born 1964), American fashion designer
Theresa LePore, Supervisor of Elections for Palm Beach County, Florida
Tony Lepore (born 1947), American police officer

Other
The Lepore Extrusion, musical album released in 2006

Italian-language surnames